In computer science and mathematical logic, a function type (or arrow type or exponential) is the type of a variable or parameter to which a function has or can be assigned, or an argument or result type of a higher-order function taking or returning a function.

A function type depends on the type of the parameters and the result type of the function (it, or more accurately the unapplied type constructor , is a higher-kinded type). The class of such maps or functions is called the exponential object. The act of currying makes the function type adjoint to the product type; this is explored in detail in the article on currying.

The function type can be considered to be a special case of the dependent product type, which among other properties, encompasses the idea of a polymorphic function.

Programming languages 
The syntax used for function types in several programming languages can be summarized, including an example type signature for the higher-order function composition function:

When looking at the example type signature of, for example C#, the type of the function  is actually Func<Func<A,B>,Func<B,C>,Func<A,C>>.

Due to type erasure in C++11's std::function, it is more common to use templates for higher order function parameters and type inference (auto) for closures.

Denotational semantics 
The function type in programming languages does not correspond to the space of all set-theoretic functions. Given the countably infinite type of natural numbers as the domain and the booleans as range, then there are an uncountably infinite number (2ℵ0 = c) of set-theoretic functions between them. Clearly this space of functions is larger than the number of functions that can be defined in any programming language, as there exist only countably many programs (a program being a finite sequence of a finite number of symbols) and one of the set-theoretic functions effectively solves the halting problem.

Denotational semantics concerns itself with finding more appropriate models (called domains) to model programming language concepts such as function types. It turns out that restricting expression to the set of computable functions is not sufficient either if the programming language allows writing non-terminating computations (which is the case if the programming language is Turing complete). Expression must be restricted to the so-called continuous functions (corresponding to continuity in the Scott topology, not continuity in the real analytical sense). Even then, the set of continuous function contains the parallel-or function, which cannot be correctly defined in all programming languages.

See also 
 Cartesian closed category
 Currying
 Exponential object, category-theoretic equivalent
 First-class function
 Function space, set-theoretic equivalent

References 
 
 
 
 Homotopy Type Theory: Univalent Foundations of Mathematics, The Univalent Foundations Program, Institute for Advanced Study. See section 1.2.

Data types
Subroutines
Type theory